Aston End is a hamlet in Hertfordshire, England. It is in the civil parish of Aston. It features a pub and a butchers, as well as a few houses.

References

External links

Hamlets in Hertfordshire
East Hertfordshire District